Erith Town Football Club is a football club based in Erith in the London Borough of Bexley, England.

History
The club was established in 1959 as a Sunday league club under the name Woolwich Town. They initially played in the London Metropolitan Sunday League and were Senior Section champions in 1965–66, 1970–71 and 1974–75. In 1989 the club was renamed Woolwich Heathway, but reverted to their original name within a year. In 1991 they began playing Saturday football, joining Division Two of the Spartan League. Despite only finishing ninth in their first season in Division Two, the club were promoted to Division One due to league restructuring. In 1994–95 they finished second in Division One, earning promotion to the Premier Division.

In 1996 Woolwich transferred to the Kent League, and at the end of the 1996–97 season were renamed Erith Town due to their move to the Erith Stadium. They won the Kent League's Premier Division Cup in 2007–08, beating Hythe Town 1–0 in the final. The club reached the final again the following season, losing 3–1 on penalties to Croydon after a 1–1 draw. A proposed merger with Dartford Town in the summer of 2010 was abandoned, and the club went on to win the Kent Senior Trophy in 2010–11 with a 3–1 win over Tunbridge Wells in the final. In 2013 the league was renamed the Southern Counties East League.

Ground
During the club's time in Sunday league they played at the Woolwich Barracks Stadium. When they joined the Spartan League, they moved to Greenwich Borough's Harrow Meadow ground. In October 1995 they moved to the Erith Sports Stadium, an athletics stadium. They temporarily returned to Harrow Meadow during the 1998–99 season whilst the Erith Sports Stadium was renovated.

In 2008 the club began groundsharing at Thamesmead Town's Bayliss Avenue, before returning to the Erith Sports Stadium the following season. In 2013 they moved to Cray Valley PM's Badgers Sports Ground in Eltham. In 2016 they returned to the Borough of Bexley, moving to VCD Athletic's Oakwood ground. The club moved back to the Erith Sports Stadium in 2018.

Honours
Southern Counties East League
Premier Division Cup winners 2007–08
London Metropolitan Sunday League
Senior Section champions 1965–66, 1970–71, 1974–75
Kent Senior Trophy
Winners 2010–11

Records
Best FA Cup performance: Second qualifying round, 2004–05, 2007–08, 2010–11, 2011–12
Best FA Vase performance: Third round, 2013–14
Record attendance: 444 vs Portsmouth, FA Youth Cup first round, 3 November 2021
Biggest victory: 9–0 vs Sporting Bengal United, 15 January 2011
Most appearances: Alan Hanlon, 363
Most goals: Dean Bowey

See also
Erith Town F.C. players

References

External links
Official website

Football clubs in England
Football clubs in London
Sport in the London Borough of Bexley
Association football clubs established in 1959
1959 establishments in England
Spartan League
Southern Counties East Football League